Myrkskog is a death metal band formed in 1993 from Drammen, Norway.

History

Their music consists of high speed double-bass with rapid blastbeats and fills. Guitars are made up of harmonic tremolo picking and sometimes power chords with fast solos composed by Destructhor who, along with Secthdamon, were members in Zyklon. Their debut album Deathmachine is a hybrid of black metal and death metal. Their second album Superior Massacre is much more death metal-oriented with more prominent bass-lines and less tremolo picked riffs.

The name 'Myrkskog' is a translation of the Norwegian word for 'Mirkwood'. Destructhor joined Morbid Angel in 2008 and departed in 2015. Secthdamon, since 2005 is a live member for Emperor.

The current line-up is guitarist/vocalist Destructhor, guitarist/backing vocalist Secthdamon, bassist Demariel (or Gortheon) and drummer Dominator. Secthdamon changed from drums to guitar in 2013. Myrkskog has released two full-Length albums through the UK's Candlelight Records. Their second studio album, Superior Massacre, also contains material by the Norwegian experimental duo Epilektrician, used as intro and outro.  According to the band's official Instagram page, they are currently in the process of recording new material for a third album and will be the band’s first new material released in over 20 years.

Members

Current members
 Destructhor - guitars (1993–present), lead vocals (2001–present)
 Secthdamon (Tony Ingebrigtsen) - guitars, backing vocals (1996-1997, 2013–present); drums (1997–2013)
 Gortheon - bass (2001–present)
 Dominator (Nils Fjellström) - drums (2013–present)

Former members
 Master V - bass, lead vocals (1993-2001)
 Lars Petter - drums (1993-1994)
 Bjørn Thomas - drums (1994-1995)
 Anders Eek - drums (1996-1997)

Timeline

Discography
 Ode til Norge - (1995, demo)
 Apocalyptic Psychotica - The Murder Tape - (1998, demo)
 Deathmachine - (2000, Candlelight Records)
 Superior Massacre - (2002, Candlelight Records)

References

External links
 Candlelight (Record Label)

Norwegian blackened death metal musical groups
Norwegian death metal musical groups
Musical groups established in 1993
1993 establishments in Norway
Musical groups disestablished in 2003
2003 disestablishments in Norway
Musical groups reestablished in 2007
Norwegian musical trios
Musical groups from Drammen
Candlelight Records artists